United States gubernatorial elections were held in 1947, in three states. Kentucky, Louisiana and Mississippi hold their gubernatorial elections in odd numbered years, every 4 years, preceding the United States presidential election year.

Results

References

 
November 1947 events in the United States